Orrgo is a fictional character appearing in American comic books published by Marvel Comics.

Publication history

Orrgo first appeared in Strange Tales #90 and was created by Jack Kirby.

As part of the All-New, All-Different Marvel, Orrgo appears in Howling Commandos of S.H.I.E.L.D.

Fictional biography
Orrgo is a 25–30 ft. extraterrestrial "space god", who has tried to conquer Earth many times in the past. He arrived on Earth to display his superior powers over the humans. With his abilities, Orrgo took over the world quickly. With the human race under his mental domination, Orrgo went back to the circus where it first arrived and went to sleep. A circus gorilla named Jojo realized that it was the reason that it was not being fed. Jojo escaped from its cage and killed Orrgo. The human race was then freed from Orrgo's control as the rest of Orrgo's kind left thinking that the humans have defeated Orrgo.

The Headmen later stole the God from Beyond from the museum and used it to summon Orrgo.

The Headmen and MODOK summoned Orrgo using the God from Beyond statue. Hellcat, Nighthawk, and Valkyrie of the Defenders fought Orrgo only to be defeated by him. Orrgo then went on to attack the city. After making volcanoes erupt, cities levitate, and populated areas burst into flames, Orrgo took control of the minds of Earth's population. The Headmen, MODOK, and the Defenders were not affected because they came in contact with the God from Beyond. When the Defenders attacked the Headmen's base, they ordered Orrgo to summon a supervillain army to fight them. While Doctor Strange, Hulk, Namor, and Silver Surfer were busy fighting the villains, Hellcat, Nighthawk, and Valkyrie enter the base of the Headmen as Nighthawk seized the God from Beyond. With the God from Beyond in their possession, the Defenders ordered Orrgo to undo the damage that it caused. With the damage undone and the supervillains teleported back to where they came from, Doctor Strange stated that they could banish all evil from Earth. Hellcat broke the God from Beyond stating that it would be a violation of the free will to do such a thing. Upon being freed, Orrgo thought for itself again and threatened to devastate the planet. Hellcat reminded Orrgo that his race has always been defeated by the humans and asked if he really wanted to fight them. Orrgo decides to leave Earth and return when the humans are extinct.

Through unknown means, Orrgo was captured by S.H.I.E.L.D. and placed in the Howling Commandos Monster Force.

Orrgo appears as a member of S.T.A.K.E., a S.H.I.E.L.D. division dealing with the supernatural. His commander is Dum Dum Dugan, who lives on in a highly advanced Life Model Decoy body.

As part of the All-New, All-Different Marvel event, Orrgo appears as a member of S.T.A.K.E.'s Howling Commandos. Due to Orrgo's enormous size, he is not a field member of the team, but is used as technological support and communications. He enjoys chaotic events. Despite the very nature of many of his teammates, Orggo does not believe in the supernatural.

During the Avengers: Standoff! storyline, Orrgo was an inmate of Pleasant Hill, a gated community established by S.H.I.E.L.D. It is later revealed that Orrgo ended up in Pleasant Hill after Dr. Paul Kraye caught him going through his files. He alerted Maria Hill claiming that Orrgo went rogue and Orrgo was imprisoned at Pleasant Hill, where he was turned into a dog by Kobik. This led the Life Model Decoy of Dum Dum Dugan into finding Pleasant Hill and leading the Howling Commandos there in order to rescue Orrgo. Orrgo is rescued as the group is transported back to S.T.A.K.E. HQ by Kobik. Once back at S.T.A.K.E. HQ, Orrgo detects that Paul Kraye has released all the inmates there.

Orrgo was with the Howling Commandos at the time when they help Old Man Logan rescue Jubilee from Dracula.

During the Monsters Unleashed storyline, Orrgo is among the monsters that helped to fight the Leviathon Tide.

Powers and abilities

Aside from his superhuman strength, Orrgo has great mental powers that seem to alter reality. He also possesses powerful lungs as he was able to blow people off their feet. He also seems to have some manner of freezing abilities.

Other versions

Marvel Adventures
In the Marvel Adventures continuity, Orrgo is shown to be roughly the size of the Thing and continually boasts that he has "amazing mental powers". Immediately after a battle with the Fantastic Four, Orrgo gains diplomatic immunity and shows up to judge a beauty contest where he proceeds to get into an argument with Ben over their terms of 'beauty'. Eventually Sue discovers through one of the contestants, Chili Storm, that the security team are actually agents of A.I.M. and are looking to steal Orrgo's technology. The Four aid Orrgo in battling the agents before being stopped by Orrgo's powers. Orrgo then orders the agents to get jobs at a fast food restaurant, which Johnny calls cruel. Afterwards, Chili chooses to go out with Orrgo which he considers his revenge on Ben from an earlier fight.

In other media

Video games 
Orrgo appears as a boss and recruitable character in the mobile game Marvel Avengers Academy during the limited Monsters Unleashed! event, voiced by Scott Montiel. Writer Allen Warner praised his "goofy, crazy, over-the-top attitude and power set that make[s] him a great fit for the game, and perfect for an event that features a red dinosaur fighting a dragon from outer space".

Notes
 Adam Able's home planet was called Orrgo in Journey into Mystery vol. 1 #82.

References

External links
Orrgo at Marvel Wiki

Characters created by Jack Kirby
Comics characters introduced in 1961
Fictional monsters
Howling Commandos
Marvel Comics aliens
Marvel Comics characters with superhuman strength
Marvel Comics characters who have mental powers
Marvel Comics extraterrestrial superheroes
Marvel Comics male superheroes